Damon Gameau is an Australian actor, director, and producer, known for his documentaries That Sugar Film and 2040. Gameau has also appeared in a number of award-winning TV shows and films, such as Love My Way, The Tracker and Balibo.

Career

Gameau has not acted for 8 years. He is now a full time director since his success with That Sugar Film and 2040. Gameau was recently nominated for NSW Australian of the Year for his work in 'the Regeneration' movement. His '2040' documentary included an extensive impact campaign that has seen 1.5 million students be taught the curriculum materials, hundreds of farmers receive assistance to switch to regenerative practices plus the building of the first seaweed platform in Tasmania.

His current film is called Regenerate Australia 2030 and is a vision for Australia in 2030 based on interviews with a variety of Australians from differing backgrounds.

He is the co founder of Regen Studios.
 
Gameau graduated from Australia's National Institute of Dramatic Art (NIDA) with a degree in Performing Arts (Acting) in 1999.

In 2011, he won the short film competition, Tropfest with his animation 'Animal Beatbox'.

In 2014, he announced the production of the documentary That Sugar Film in which he relates the dire mood swings and weight gain he experienced after taking on the low-fat, high-sugar diet for 60 days. Gameau wrote a companion book for the film, That Sugar Book, which reached the top of the Health & Well-being best-seller lists in Australia.

That Sugar Film is the highest grossing Australian documentary released in cinemas across Australia and New Zealand.

His most recent film, 2040, is a documentary is a letter to his 4-year-old daughter showing her what the world could look like in 2040 if we put into action the best solutions to many of our environmental challenges. It premiered at the Berlin Film Festival and has recently become one of the highest grossing Australian documentaries of all time in Australia. He also wrote an accompanying book, 2040: handbook for the regeneration'.

He appeared in the 2009 feature film Balibo, in which he plays the part of Seven Network reporter Greg Shackleton. He starred as Scotsman Andy Maher in the Australian TV miniseries Underbelly: A Tale of Two Cities.

Gameau starred as Sonny in the Australian movie Thunderstruck, a tale of a group of friends and their devotion to AC/DC and in particular Bon Scott.

He appeared in RTÉ's latest Irish drama, Raw, based in an exclusive Dublin restaurant. playing the head chef Geoff Mitchell from Seasons 1 to 5. Gameau portrayed a homosexual character and received great praise for his performance throughout his time on the series. He also starred in Spirited as Adrian Brixton alongside Claudia Karvan and Matt King.

In 2012, he featured in both episodes of Howzat! Kerry Packer's War drama-miniseries as Australian batsman Greg Chappell.

In 2013, he appeared in an episode of Wentworth as Mark Pearson.

Gameau is in a relationship with Winners and Losers actress, Zoe Tuckwell-Smith. Together they have 2 children.

Awards and honours
Gameau was nominated for NSW Australian of the Year in 2020 for his work in creating 'the Regeneration' movement which is associated with his film 2040.
Gameau won the Best Documentary Award for That Sugar Film at the Australian Film and Television awards in 2016.  
In 2007, Gameau won the Best Actor award for his role in the film Vermin at the Sydney Underground Film Festival.
 Nominated for Best Supporting Actor for Balibo at AFI awards.
 Gameau has begun a directing career also with his film One, reaching the finals of Tropfest in 2010 and his film Animal Beatbox winning the 2011 competition. 
His first documentary feature, That Sugar Film, was selected for Berlin Film Festival and IDFA.. The film was nominated for the AACTA award for best feature-length documentary. It is still the highest grossing Australian Documentary of all time across Australia and New Zealand.

Filmography

References

External links

21st-century Australian male actors
Australian documentary filmmakers
Australian film directors
Australian food writers
Australian male film actors
Australian male television actors
Australian non-fiction writers
Australian people of French descent
Australian people of Irish descent
Living people
National Institute of Dramatic Art alumni
Year of birth missing (living people)